Bert Williams (1874–1922) was an American entertainer.

Bert Williams or Bertie Williams may also refer to:

Bert Williams (Australian footballer) (1873–1955), Australian rules footballer
Bert Williams (footballer, born 1905) (1905–1974), Welsh professional footballer
Bert Williams (footballer, born 1920) (1920–2014), English professional footballer
Bertie Williams (1907–1968), Welsh footballer
Bertie Williams (Aboriginal activist), co-founder of the Aboriginal Tent Embassy in 1972
Bertram Williams (sport shooter) (1876–1934), Canadian sport shooter, known as Bert

See also
Albert Williams (disambiguation)
Bert Williams Leisure Centre
Bertram Williams-Ellis
Herbert Williams (disambiguation)
Hubert Williams, pilot
Robert Williams (disambiguation)